Research Synthesis Methods is a peer-reviewed multidisciplinary scientific journal covering all aspects of research methods as they have been applied to research synthesis. It was established in 2010 and is published by John Wiley & Sons on behalf of the Society for Research Synthesis Methodology, of which it is the official journal. The founding editors-in-chief were Christopher Schmid (Brown University) and Mark Lipsey (Vanderbilt University),. The role of editor-in-chief went to Hannah Rothstein (Baruch College), Ian Shrier (Lady Davis Institute for Medical Research), Tasha Beretvas (University of Texas at Austin), and Gerta Rücker (Albert Ludwigs University of Freiburg, Germany). Currently, Terri D. Pigott (Georgia State University) and Dimitris Mavridis (University of Ioannina, Greece) act as editors. According to the Journal Citation Reports, the journal has a 2021 impact factor of 9.308, ranking it 3rd out of 57 journals in the category "Mathematical & Computational Biology" and 11th out of 73 journals in the category "Multidisciplinary Sciences".

Despite the journal's stated inclusive disciplinary scope, commentators have noted that articles published in the journal tend to be focused on quantitative forms of research synthesis, such as meta-analysis, and to adopt a positivist perspective on the practice of research synthesis.

References

External links

Publications established in 2010
Wiley (publisher) academic journals
Quarterly journals
Research methods journals
Multidisciplinary scientific journals
English-language journals
Statistics journals
Academic journals associated with international learned and professional societies